The Chemin de fer à vapeur des Trois Vallées is a heritage railway in southern Belgium, created in 1973.

It is a non-profit society that operates a railway from the town of Mariembourg, near Couvin to Treignes, near Viroinval. The length of the railway runs about 14 km over standard gauge track. The society's name comes from the three rivers followed by the line; River Eau Blanche, River Eau Noire, and River Viroin. The heritage railway connects with the greater Belgian rail network in Mariembourg.

The society runs two main facilities. The society has constructed its own platforms near the old locomotive roundhouse and water tower in Mariembourg, and in Treignes, a former border station, a museum with a large workshop has been built. The last 3 kilometers from the line (partially established in France) are no longer usable, as its tunnel has been sold and turned in a mushroom growing plant.

Founded by former rail employees, the society purchased many steam engines from the largely nascent coal industry in its early years. Since then, it has also acquired representative rolling stocks from Belgium and neighbouring countries, France and Luxembourg, and from countries where steam locomotives were still in use, such as Poland and East Germany.

Rolling stock

Steam locomotives

Operational
 AD05 (OOOt): built by Ateliers métallurgiques, Tubize in 1926 for coal mine André Dumont (Waterschei). Restored in 2009.
 SA01 (OOOt): built by Anglo-Franco-Belge in 1945. Acquired operational in 1978. Firebox replaced in 2008–2010.
 NE61 (OOOOt) : built by SACM, Graffenstaden in 1952 for Neuenkirche Hütte.

Under reconstruction
 DR 50 3696-7 (oOOOOO): built by Krupp in 1939. 
 PKP TKt 48 (oOOOOot): built by the Stalin workshop, Poznań. Restored in 2005 in fantasy blue livery.
 DR 64 250 (oOOOot): built by Henschel in 1933
 ELNA 158 (oOOOt): built by Henschel in 1940 for Teutoburger Wald-Eisenbahn, purchased from Stoomtrein Goes - Borsele.
 SA03 (OOOt): built by Ateliers métallurgiques, Tubize in 1929. Restored in 2014.
 SNCV 808 (OOOt): built by Société Saint Léonard, Liège, in 1894. Restored in 2007.
 DG22 (OOt): built by Cockerill, Liège, in 1913 for Heuze – Malevez – Simon, Auvelais. Small shunter with vertical boiler. Acquired operational in 1980.
 MF32 (OOt): built by Haine Saint Pierre in 1904 for Monceau-Fontaine coal mine. Acquired in 1976. Under reconstruction.

Stored, cosmetic condition
DR 52-467 (ex 52 8200-9 oOOOOO) : built by Borsig in 1942, reko-lok retrofitted to its original type in 2004.
 AD09 (OOOOt): Ateliers de construction de La Meuse, Liège in 1950 for coal mine André Dumont.
 MF91 (OOOOt): built by Usines Metallurgiques du Hainaut, Couillet in 1930. Acquired operational in 1975. This engine has hauled the first train of the CFV3V.
 MF73 (OOOt): built by Usines Metallurgiques du Hainaut, Couillet in 1922. Acquired operational in 1975. 
 PF84 (OOt): acquired from Pieux Franki, Liège. Displayed as monument in Treignes.
 MF33 (OOt): built by Haine Saint Pierre in 1911 for Monceau-Fontaine coal mine. Acquired operational in 1976. Sold in 2013 to National Railway Company of Belgium for Trainworld.

In storage, needing restoration
 ÖBB 52-3314 (oOOOOO): built by Jung in 1944.
 SA02 (OOOt): built by Anglo-Franco-Belge. Rusted and in bad technical condition. may be used for didactical purpose.
 MF62 (OOt): built by Baldwin, Philadelphia in 1916 for the US Transportation Corp. Former SNCB type 50.
 n° 1 (OOt) Clabecq. Rusted. Acquired in 2003.

A few other locomotives from the National Railway Company of Belgium are display at Treignes Museum.

Diesel locomotive

Operational
 SNCB 5120 (Co'Co'), built by Cockerill (Liège) in 1961. Green painting scheme.
 SNCB 6086 (Bo'Bo'), built by Cockerill (Liège) in 1964. Yellow painting scheme.
 SNCB 7304 (C), built by BN in 1965.
 SNCB 9008 (B), built by Cockerill (Liège) in 1964. 
 Fina 1 (B), built by Hunslet, Leeds in 1983. used to be operated at FINA's oil refinery, Antwerp.
 Fina 2 (B), built by Cockerill (Liège) in 1963. 
 VL02-1 and VL02-2 B, built by Cockerill (Liège) for Dolomies de Marche les Dames. Repainted in the Class 77 painting scheme (as the two similar units from SNCB's Ostend depot)
 SNCF 63123 (Bo'Bo'), built by Brissonneau et Lotz in 1956. Repainted as CFL BB 914 (previously in Swiss' CFF Em 4/41123)
 SNCF 63149 (Bo'Bo'), built by Brissonneau et Lotz in 1956. In SNCF's original green painting scheme.
 SNCF Y 5130 (B), built by De Dietrich, Reichshoffen in 1964.
 SNCF Y 6502 (B), 1957.

In storage, needing restoration
 GV69 (B), built by ABR (Ateliers Belges Réunis), Familleureux in 1964
 FDP1 (B), built by Klöckner Humboldt Deutz, Köln in 1956 for Frateur - De Pourcq, railway infrastructure company in Boom (Belgium).

Diesel railcar 
 SNCB 4407 built by Ateliers Germain, Monceau-sur-Sambre in 1954,
 SNCB 4510
 SNCB 4608, 4610, 4611 et 4616 built by the  works in Mechelen in 1952,
 SNCF X3998 "Picasso",
 CFL 211 built by Westwaggon (Köln-Deutz), 1956.
 Mindener Kreisbahnen VT3, built by Talbot Aachen Waggonfabrik in 1953 for Mindener Kreisbahn (local railways of Minden, Germany). Numbered 550.09.

References

External links
Official website

Heritage railways in Belgium
1973 establishments in Belgium